Adlai Stevenson may refer to:

 Adlai Stevenson I (1835–1914), U.S. Vice President (1893–1897) and Congressman (1879–1881)
 Adlai Stevenson II (1900–1965), Governor of Illinois (1949–1953), U.S. presidential candidate (1952, 1956, 1960), U.N. Ambassador (1961–1965), grandson of Adlai Stevenson 
 Adlai Stevenson III (1930–2021) U.S. Senator (1970–1981), candidate for Illinois governor (1982, 1986), son of Adlai Stevenson II
 Adlai Stevenson IV (born 1956), business executive and journalist, son of Adlai Stevenson III

See also
 Adlai Stevenson House (disambiguation)
 Adlai E. Stevenson High School (disambiguation)
 Stevenson College (University of California, Santa Cruz)
 Stevenson family